Paul Douglas (1892–1976) was an American economist and US senator.

Paul Douglas may also refer to:

Paul Douglas (actor) (1907–1959), American film actor
Paul Douglas (meteorologist) (born 1958), meteorologist, formerly of KARE-TV and WCCO-TV, both in Minneapolis-St.Paul
Paul Douglas (cameraman) (1957–2006), British CBS News cameraman
Paul Douglas (cricketer) (born 1971), former English cricketer
Paul Douglas (boxer) (born 1964), Irish boxer
Paul L. Douglas (1927–2012), Nebraska Attorney General
Paul Douglas (musician) (born 1950), drummer and percussionist
Paul P. Douglas Jr. (1919–2002), United States Air Force officer
Paul Douglas (footballer) (born 1997), Bermudan footballer

See also
Paul Douglass (1905–1988), president of American University